The 1987 King of the Ring was the third annual King of the Ring professional wrestling tournament produced by the World Wrestling Federation (WWF, now WWE). The tournament was held on September 4, 1987 at the Providence Civic Center in Providence, Rhode Island as a special non-televised house show. The 1987 tournament was won by Randy Savage. In addition to the tournament, there was only one other match during the night. In this match Jake Roberts defeated the WWF Intercontinental Champion The Honky Tonk Man with Jimmy Hart via disqualification, after Hart accidentally hit Honky Tonk Man with the megaphone.

Production

Background
The King of the Ring tournament was an annual single-elimination tournament that was established by the World Wrestling Federation (WWF, now WWE) in 1985 with the winner being crowned the "King of the Ring." The 1987 tournament was the third King of the Ring tournament. It was held on September 4, 1987 at the Providence Civic Center in Providence, Rhode Island and like the previous years, it was a special non-televised house show.

Storylines
The matches resulted from scripted storylines, where wrestlers portrayed heroes, villains, or less distinguishable characters in scripted events that built tension and culminated in a wrestling match or series of matches. Results were predetermined by World Wrestling Federation's writers.

Results

Tournament bracket

References

1987
1987 in professional wrestling
1987 in Rhode Island
Events in Rhode Island
Professional wrestling in Providence, Rhode Island
September 1987 events in the United States